Liverpool Edge Hill by-election may refer to one of two parliamentary by-elections held in the British House of Commons constituency of Liverpool Edge Hill:

 1947 Liverpool Edge Hill by-election
 1979 Liverpool Edge Hill by-election

See also
 Liverpool Edge Hill (UK Parliament constituency)